The Viceroy of Huguang, fully referred to in Chinese as the Governor-General of Hubei and Hunan Provinces and the Surrounding Areas; Overseeing Military Affairs, Food Production; Director of Civil Affairs, was one of eight regional Viceroys in China proper during the Qing dynasty. The Viceroy of Huguang had jurisdiction over Hubei and Hunan provinces, which were previously a single province called "Huguang Province" in the Ming dynasty, hence the name "Huguang".

History
The office was created in 1644 as the "Viceroy of Huguang" during the reign of the Shunzhi Emperor. Its headquarters were in Wuchang (present-day Wuchang District, Wuhan, Hubei). It was abolished in 1668 during the reign of the Kangxi Emperor but was restored in 1670 as the "Viceroy of Chuan-Hu" (川湖總督; "Viceroy of (Si)chuan and Hu(guang)"), with its headquarters in Chongqing. In 1674, the office of Viceroy of Chuan-Hu was split into the Viceroy of Sichuan and Viceroy of Huguang, and had remained as such until 1904. In 1904, during the reign of the Guangxu Emperor, the office of Provincial Governor of Hubei was merged into the office of Viceroy of Huguang.

List of Viceroys of Huguang

References

 

History of Hubei
History of Hunan